Antun Aleksandrović Dalmatin was 16th century translator and publisher of Protestant liturgical books.

Name and early life 
Antun's surname is an exonym which means "of Dalmatia". Dalmatin was probably from Senj.

South Slavic Bible Institute 
The South Slavic Bible Institute was established in Urach (modern-day Bad Urach) in January 1561 by Baron Hans von Ungnad, who was its owner and patron. Within the institute Ungnad set up a press which he referred to as "the Slovene, Croatian and Cyrillic press". The manager and supervisor of the institute was Primož Trubar. The books they printed at this press were planned to be used throughout the entire territory populated by South Slavs between the Soča River, the Black Sea, and Constantinople. For this task, Trubar engaged Stjepan Konzul Istranin and Antun Dalmatin as translators for Croatian and Serbian. The Cyrillic text was responsibility of Antun Dalmatin.

Language used by Dalmatin and Istranin was based on northern-Chakavian dialect with elements of Shtokavian and Ikavian. People from the institute, including Trubar, were not satisfied with translations of Dalmatin and Istranin. Trubar and two of them exchanged heated correspondence about correctness of the language two of them used even before the first edition translated by Dalmatin and Istranin was published and immediately after it. For long time they tried to engage certain Dimitrije Serb to help them, but without success. Eventually, they managed to engage two Serbian Orthodox priests, Jovan Maleševac from Ottoman Bosnia and Matija Popović from Ottoman Serbia.

See also

 List of Glagolitic books
 Stjepan Konzul Istranin

References

Sources 

 
 
 
 
 
 
 
 
 
 
 
 
 
 

16th-century Protestant theologians
1597 deaths
16th-century translators
Translators to Serbian
Translators to Croatian